Horst Sellentin (14 September 1922 – 10 May 1973) was a German baritone and a choral conductor.

Born in Berlin, Sellentin studied instrumental music, voice and conducting. He worked at the Theater Lübeck from 1946 to 1948. From 1948 he was a singer of the NDR Chor in Hamburg who also appeared as a soloist. 
In 1960, he co-founded with Max Thurn the boys' choir of the NDR, called  in Hamburg and was its director. When the choir became part of the new church , the name was changed to Hamburger Knabenchor St. Nikolai. Sellentin was its conductor until 1971.

Selected recordings 
 Unser Sandmännchen - Auf ins Traumland! Sony BMG Music Entertainment (Germany), Munich 2008
 Tchaikovsky: Eugen Onegin. Line Music, Hamburg 2005
 Verdi: Höhepunkte aus La Traviata. Karussell, Hamburg; Polygram-Musik-Vertrieb, Hamburg [1986]
 Die allerschönsten Kinderlieder. Miller International, Quickborn 1975 and 1979

External links 
 
 Chronik des Hamburger Knabenchors, 12. April 2002

German operatic baritones
German choral conductors
German male conductors (music)
1922 births
1973 deaths
20th-century German male opera singers
20th-century German conductors (music)